Valdeorras is a comarca in the Galician Province of Ourense. The overall population of this  local region is 25,500 (2019).

Municipalities
O Barco de Valdeorras, capital of the comarca
O Bolo
Carballeda de Valdeorras
Larouco
 Petín
 A Rúa
 Rubiá
 A Veiga 
Vilamartín de Valdeorras

References

External links
Valdeorras site
Comarca de Valdeorras

Comarcas of the Province of Ourense